The Oyster River is a river in north-eastern Minnesota, located in St. Louis County, approximately  north of McComber, Minnesota.

See also
List of rivers of Minnesota

References

External links
Minnesota Watersheds
USGS Hydrologic Unit Map - State of Minnesota (1974)

Rivers of Minnesota